Process Explorer is a freeware task manager and system monitor for Microsoft Windows created by SysInternals, which has been acquired by Microsoft and re-branded as Windows Sysinternals. It provides the functionality of Windows Task Manager along with a rich set of features for collecting information about processes running on the user's system. It can be used as the first step in debugging software or system problems.

Process Explorer can be used to track down problems. For example, it provides a means to list or search for named resources that are held by a process or all processes. This can be used to track down what is holding a file open and preventing its use by another program. As another example, it can show the command lines used to start a program, allowing otherwise identical processes to be distinguished. Like Task Manager, it can show a process that is maxing out the CPU, but unlike Task Manager it can show which thread (with the callstack) is using the CPU – information that is not even available under a debugger.

History 
Process Explorer began in the early Sysinternals days as two separate utilities, HandleEx and DLLView, which were merged in 2001. Until 2008, Process Explorer worked on Windows 9x, Windows NT 4.0 and Windows 2000. Versions of Process Explorer up to 12.04 work on Windows 2000; versions 14.0 and higher do not require credui.dll (which is only available since Windows XP/2003). Windows XP is supported up to version 16.05. The current version runs on Windows Vista and upwards. The open source software "Process Hacker" has been developed with the aim to replicate its functionality.

Features 
 Hierarchical view of processes
 Ability to display an icon and company name next to each process
 Live CPU activity graph in the task bar
 Ability to suspend selected process
 Ability to raise the window attached to a process, thus "unhiding" it
 Complete process tree can be killed
 Interactively alter a service process's access security
 Interactively set the priority of a process
 Disambiguates service executables which perform multiple service functions.  For example, when the pointer is placed over a svchost.exe, it will tell if it is the one performing automatic updates/secondary logon/etc., or the one providing RPC, or the one performing terminal services, and so on
 There is an option (in a process's context menu) to verify a process in VirusTotal
 There is an option to display DLLs loaded by process (View => Lower Pane View => DLLs); an option Show Lower Pane has to be switched on
 There is an option to display processes' handles which includes named mutants, events, sockets, files, registry keys etc. (View => Lower Pane View => Handles); an option Show Lower Pane has to be switched on
 In properties of a process a user can view the process's threads and threads' stack traces
 There is a command to create a process dump (mini or full) (Process => Create Dump)
 There is a Find command which allows for searching a handle or DLL which can be used to identify the process(es) holding a file lock
 There is an option (in handle context menu) to close a selected handle
 Version 15 added GPU monitoring

See also 
 Activity Monitor
 Ksysguard
 Process Lasso
 Resource Monitor
 Taskkill
 Tasklist
 Process Monitor – capturing file system and Registry activity.
 ProcDump

References

External links 
 Process Explorer Official Webpage Microsoft Retrieved on December 29, 2008
 Using Process Explorer to tame svchost.exe - Advanced topics February 9, 2008
 Process Explorer Part 2 February 10, 2008
 Process Explorer Guide for Newbies  February 27, 2009
 Sysinternals Suite at Microsoft Technet Updated continuously as of August 2009

Utilities for Windows
2001 software
Microsoft software